Christopher Cantwell is an American writer, producer, and director who has worked in television, film, and comic books. He is best known as one of the two co-creators of the TV series Halt and Catch Fire, for which he also served as a producer, showrunner, screenwriter, and director. He also directed the 2019 film The Parts You Lose. Cantwell is a writer of comic books that includes The Blue Flame, She Could Fly, Everything, Doctor Doom, The Mask, Iron Man, Captain America, and Star Wars: Obi-Wan. He served as an executive producer of the television adaptation of the comic book Paper Girls.

Background

Cantwell was born in Chicago, Illinois. In the 1980s, the family moved to Dallas, Texas. Cantwell attended the University of Southern California and enrolled in its screenwriting program as an undergraduate. He began writing with Chris Rogers in August 2010, and they created Halt and Catch Fire together.

Cantwell wrote a comic book series for the character Doctor Doom. It was nominated for a 2020 Eisner Award for Best New Series.

Personal life
He currently lives in Claremont, California, with his wife, Elizabeth Cantwell, a writer, and their two children. On January 14, 2021, he came out as bisexual on his Twitter page.

Credits

References

External links

People from Chicago
Showrunners
Year of birth missing (living people)
Film directors from Illinois
Living people
LGBT film producers
LGBT television producers
Bisexual men
21st-century American LGBT people
21st-century American male writers
American comics writers
American male television writers
American bisexual writers